Monserrate Román a.k.a. "Monsi", is a Puerto Rican scientist in NASA who helped NASA build part of the International Space Station. She is the Chief Microbiologist for the Environmental Control and Life Support System project who determines how microbes will behave under different situations and in different locations, such as the nooks and crannies of the Space Station.

Early years

Román (birth name: Monserrate Román Cerezo ) was born and raised in Puerto Rico, where she also received her primary and secondary education. It was as a child that she developed her fascination with science and living organisms. She was inspired by her science teachers who nurtured her curiosity and encouraged her to participate in the local science fairs which at the same time allowed her to work with real scientists. She enrolled in the University of Puerto Rico after graduating from high school. Because of her in interest in microbiology, Román would wash dishes in the institution's science laboratory with the intention of having access to the same. Eventually she was hired as a research assistant before earning her bachelor's degree in biology. Román continued her academic education and earned a master's degree in microbiology with a minor in chemistry at the University of Alabama in Huntsville.

Career in NASA

In 1989, Román applied and was hired as a microbiologist by NASA's Marshall Space Flight Center (MSFC) in Huntsville, Alabama. As a microbiologist, Román studies microbes, living organisms and agents including viruses, bacteria, fungi and parasites. All of which are only visible under a microscope.

Román was a member of the team that built the International Space Station. The Station was designed with materials that are microbe-resistant. Temperature and humidity are controlled to discourage microbe growth. According to Román:

"As a little girl, I never dreamed I would be helping NASA build part of a Space Station. It has been fascinating watching the Station go from paper drawings to a real home and workplace in space."

As chief microbiologist for the Environmental Control and Life Support Systems (ECLSS) project, Román must determine how microbes will behave under different situations and in different locations, such as the nooks and crannies of the Space Station. Román must study an international, multicultural group of the microbes, since crewmembers, visitors, experiments and hardware hail from 15 Station partner countries and comes with his or her own unique set of microbes.

She ensures safe water and air for the crew of the International Space Station. Román works closely with MSFC engineers who are designing and testing the Oxygen Generation and Water Recovery equipment, a more sophisticated air and water recycling system to be installed on the Station.

Her unique experiences of development in spacecraft life support technology and training in microbiology has provided Monsi with a special perspective when it comes to engineering design and performance. Due to this unique outlook, this made her qualified for the position as project manager for the Atmosphere Resource Recovery and Environmental Monitoring (ARREM). She leads a team spanned across five NASA centers who develop Air Life Support Systems and Environmental Monitoring Systems for missions of long periods of time. In addition, she developed an in-flight monitor on the ISS and other space stations that can detect bacteria, viruses and fungi. In 2011, she received the NASA Snoopy Award for her work.

Monsi in 2018 is the Program Manager for NASA Centennial Challenges, where she encourages the public to help solve difficult technological problems both in space and on Earth. The goal is to find commonalities between space and Earth technology and solving problems even though the way of thinking is different. Monsi says, "My everything is about answering questions and solving puzzles."

Román also has over 60 technical publications, all of which are on the subjects of space microbiology, biofilm, microbial monitoring and life support systems.

Personal life

In her spare time Román helps with classes at NASA's Challenger Learning Centers and at the agency's Educator Resources Center in Huntsville. Every summer, she mentors a student who works by her side as an intern at the MSFC.

In December 2006, Román participated in the "What Did You Do At Your Job Today?" video series, an advertising campaign designed to bolster federal employee recruitment. The "What Did You Do At Your Job Today?" video series, spotlights individuals working in unique posts across the federal government. On May 7, 2007, Román was honored by the U.S. Office of Personnel Management for her outstanding work for the government.

See also

 List of Puerto Ricans
 Puerto Rican scientists and inventors
 List of Puerto Ricans in the United States Space Program
 History of women in Puerto Rico

Notes

References

Puerto Rican scientists
Living people
NASA people
University of Alabama in Huntsville alumni
Puerto Rican women scientists
Year of birth missing (living people)